Lajos Csordás (26 October 1932 – 5 April 1968) was a Hungarian footballer. He won the gold medal at the 1952 Summer Olympics and was runner-up of the 1954 FIFA World Cup.

References

External links
Profile at www.sports-reference.com

1932 births
1968 deaths
Footballers from Budapest
Hungarian footballers
Hungary international footballers
Vasas SC players
Csepel SC footballers
Footballers at the 1952 Summer Olympics
Olympic footballers of Hungary
Olympic gold medalists for Hungary
1954 FIFA World Cup players
Association football forwards
Hungarian football managers
Vasas SC managers
Olympic medalists in football
Medalists at the 1952 Summer Olympics
Nemzeti Bajnokság I managers